Come Back to the 5 & Dime, Jimmy Dean, Jimmy Dean is a 1976 play by Ed Graczyk, originally performed at the Players Theatre Columbus in Columbus, Ohio. Despite the interpretation of the name in the title, it refers to the legendary "Rebel Without a Cause", James Dean, as opposed to Jimmy Dean, the country-western singer who had a hit in 1961 with Big Bad John. The play, in fact, revolves around a James Dean fan club that reunites at a Texas five-and-dime store.

In 1982, filmmaker Robert Altman directed both a Broadway version at the Martin Beck Theater and a film adaptation of the same name.  Altman's version of the play was not well-received with critics at the time.

Synopsis
In Come Back to the 5 & Dime, Jimmy Dean, Jimmy Dean, an all-female fan club called the Disciples of James Dean meets at a Woolworths five-and-dime branch in McCarthy, Texas.  According to a 2014 interview with playwright Ed Graczyk the setting of the play is actually a H. L. Kressmont & Co. Five and Dime. The group reunites in 1975 to commemorate the twentieth anniversary of Dean's death.  (In 1955, the actor was filming Giant in Marfa, not far from where the store stands.)

Cast

Development
Ed Graczyk originally wrote and directed Come Back to the 5 & Dime, Jimmy Dean, Jimmy Dean for the Players' Theater in Columbus, Ohio, which also produced it.  At the time of the Ohio production, he said of its development:

Broadway version
Jimmy Dean had a short run in New York City in 1980.  Early that same decade, while turning his attention from Hollywood to the stage, filmmaker Robert Altman acquired the rights to Graczyk's work.  While securing options on another two works—The Hold-Up by Marsha Norman and The Diviners by Jim Leonard—he negotiated to direct Jimmy Dean on Broadway, with the intention to film it as a theatrical release.  He also spent US$850,000 of his own money bringing it to Broadway.

During the casting process, Altman considered a role for Shelley Duvall, a star of his previous film Popeye.  But, in his words, "the balance wasn't correct" this time around.  Altman found out that pop singer Cher was in New York at the time, but he did not feel sure she would land a part.  "If you're really serious," he advised her, "read for it."  Thanks to his encouragement, she landed the part of the waitress Sissy—her first major role on stage.  Another of the performers, Karen Black, previously appeared in Altman's 1975 film Nashville.

The first Broadway preview of Come Back to the 5 & Dime, Jimmy Dean, Jimmy Dean took place on February 8, 1982, (which would have been the actor's 51st birthday, had he lived).  Between February 18 and April 4, 1982, it ran for 52 performances at the Martin Beck Theater. Altman had requested that Graczyk delay collecting his royalties so that the production could run longer. Graczyk declined, later recalling that the actresses were not asked to make similar financial sacrifices.

Some time later, Altman directed a film adaptation of the same name, which went on to win the Best Film Award at the Chicago International Film Festival.

Reception
The Broadway version of Jimmy Dean was not well-received with critics.  The New York Times' Frank Rich commented that "Neither the gimmicky plot nor its cliched participants are credible."  John Simon of New York wrote, "Although the play becomes a little less boring in the second act, it is too little too late, and at the cost of some whopping improbabilities. Hit-and-miss directorial bravura and an expensive production are not enough to justify so much ado."

Notes

References

Bibliography

External links
 
 

1976 plays
1982 plays
Broadway plays
Fiction set in 1975
Plays set in Texas
Transgender-related theatre
American plays adapted into films
Cultural depictions of James Dean